The 1925 South Carolina Gamecocks football team was an American football team that represented the University of South Carolina during the 1925 Southern Conference football season. In its first season under head coach Branch Bocock, South Carolina compiled a 7–3 record (2–2 against conference opponents), tied for 10th place in the conference, shut out five of ten opponents, and outscored all opponents by a total of 150 to 27.

Schedule

References

South Carolina
South Carolina Gamecocks football seasons
South Carolina Gamecocks football